Rigo Nova (born December 12, 1979), born Rigoberto Nova Matute, is a Honduran-born American actor and writer. His background is Engineering, Mathematics, and Acting.  He and his mother (Amanda Matute) founded "Light for Honduras" - a non-profit organization geared to help those of need in Honduras.

References

External links
 

Living people
1979 births